William Nesbitt may refer to:
 William Nesbitt (Nova Scotia politician), member of the Nova Scotia House of Assembly
 William Beattie Nesbitt, member of the Legislative Assembly of Ontario 
 Billy Nesbitt, English footballer

See also
 William Nesbit (disambiguation)
 William Nisbet (disambiguation)